Bruno Felix (born 8 August 1967 in Haarlem, The Netherlands) is a director and independent new media producer.

Career
In 2000 he co-founded Submarine with Femke Wolting. Submarine is an independent production studio and online network specialized in documentaries and new media productions. In the same year, he co-founded SubmarineChannel with Wolting. As a producer, Felix has worked with renowned directors such as Douglas Gayeton, Tommy Pallotta, Peter Greenaway and Thé Tjong-Khing.

Previously, he was responsible for the new media strategy of Dutch Public broadcaster VPRO, and Director of VPRO Digital, a media research department exploring the influence of digital technology on the production, distribution and use of media.

He is known in the industry for developing games, films, and animation that differ from the mainstream with an eye for interactive on-line experiences.

Filmography

Producer
Rembrandt’s J’accuse
My Second Life
Kika & Bob

Director
It's the end of TV as we know it

References

1967 births
Living people
People from Haarlem
Dutch film producers
Dutch film directors